The San Jacinto River is a  river in Riverside County, California. The river's headwaters are in Santa Rosa and San Jacinto Mountains National Monument. The lower portion of the  watershed is urban and agricultural land. As a partially endorheic watershed that is contiguous with other Great Basin watersheds, the western side of the San Jacinto Basin is a portion of the Great Basin Divide.

Course

The river is formed at the west base of the San Jacinto Mountains by the confluence of its North and South forks. The South Fork flows from near Santa Rosa Summit, through Pine Meadow and Garner Valley to Lake Hemet, which holds  of water. Hemet Dam was built in 1895 to supply water to the city of Hemet. Downstream of the dam, the South Fork joins the North Fork east of the town of Valle Vista near Highway 74, and the main stem of the San Jacinto River continues northwest until it discharges into Mystic Lake, a couple of miles east of Lake Perris. Downstream of Railroad Canyon Dam, the river continues flowing roughly west southwest through the canyon through the Temescal Mountains for about  until it drains into Lake Elsinore. The lake usually has no outflow other than evaporation, but in years of heavy rainfall it overflows into Temescal Creek, which flows northwest to the Santa Ana River in Corona, California.

List of tributaries of the San Jacinto River
Cottonwood Canyon Creek in Railroad Canyon
Canyon Lake in Railroad Canyon
Salt Creek
Perris Valley Channel
Bautista Creek
Indian Creek
Lake Fulmor
North Fork San Jacinto River
Logan Creek
Stone Creek
Black Mountain Creek
Fuller Mill Creek
South Fork San Jacinto River
Dry Creek
Strawberry Creek
Coldwater Creek
Spillway Canyon Creek
Lake Hemet
Herkey Creek
Fobes Canyon Creek
Pipe Creek
Martinez Creek
Gold Shot Creek
Penrod Canyon Creek

References

External links
 

 
Rivers of Riverside County, California
San Jacinto Mountains
Tributaries of Temescal Creek
Tributaries of the Santa Ana River
Rivers of Southern California
Watersheds of California
Wild and Scenic Rivers of the United States